Wilensky is a surname. Notable people with the surname include:

Gail Wilensky (born 1943), American health economist
Harold Wilensky (1923–2011), American organizational sociologist
Mike Wilensky (born 1983), American politician
Robert Wilensky (1951–2013), American computer scientist